voxeljet AG, which is based in Friedberg (Bayern) near Augsburg (Germany), is a manufacturer of industrial 3D printing systems. The company has been listed on the Nasdaq since 2020, and previously listed on the New York Stock Exchange since its IPO in 2013. Besides the development and distribution of printing systems, voxeljet AG also operates service centers for the on-demand manufacture of molds and models for metal casting in Germany and abroad. These products are manufactured with the help of a generative production method based on 3D CAD data (also referred to as "3D printing").

History

Beginnings
voxeljet AG traces its roots back to the year 1995, with the first successful drop-dosing of UV adhesives. The first 3D printing trials were conducted at the Precision Engineering department of the Technical University Munich as part of the "Generation of 3D structures" project. In 1996, Dr. Ingo Ederer participated in the first Munich business plan competition and was awarded his first patent in 1998. The first sand molds were printed in the same year.

Formation of the company
Generis GmbH, the predecessor of today's voxeljet AG, was founded on 5 May 1999 by Ingo Ederer, Rainer Höchsmann and engineer Joachim Heinzl at Munich's Technical University. The purpose of the company was the development of new generative processes for the production of cast and plastic components. The company started its operations at Technical University Munich with four employees. Shortly afterwards, it refurbished and relocated into the premises in Augsburg. In the year 2002, the company completed its first orders for the delivery of sand-based printers to BMW AG and Daimler AG, before opening the service center in Augsburg in the year 2003. In the same year, Bayern Kapital GmbH, the Startkapital Fonds Augsburg and Franz Industriebeteiligungen AG joined as new shareholders.

Establishment phase
The first VX800 system was sold to Alphaform AG in 2005. This was followed by the sale of the first VX500 to the University of Rostock two years later. In 2008, voxeljet technology GmbH received an award as part of the Bavarian Innovation Prize from the hands of Bavarian premier Günther Beckstein. The company celebrated its 10-year anniversary one year later. In the spring of 2010, voxeljet moved into a new administration building and production halls in Friedberg. During the same year, voxeljet was added to the list of Germany's top 100 innovators and received the "Top 100" seal of approval.

Growth phase
In the year 2011, voxeljet introduced a series of technical innovations. In April 2011, the company opened up a new dimension of generative production methods with the VX4000 3D printing system. This system makes it possible to produce objects with a size of 4 x 2 x 1 meters at a build speed that is up to three times faster than earlier systems, while maintaining the same resolution. At the international trade fair for foundry technologies ‘’GIFA’’, voxeljet introduced the world's first continuous 3D printer, the VXC800.  The development of this continuous 3D printing technology represented the manufacturing of molds and models without tools. This machine generation runs the process steps "building" and "unpacking" in parallel, without having to interrupt system operations. Therefore, this printing system represents an important step towards industrial series production on the basis of a generative production process. In the same year, voxeljet celebrated the global premiere of its 3D printer VX1000 at EuroMold, the trade fair for tooling and mold-making, design and product development in Frankfurt am Main. By combining high performance and a large build space, this printing system was able to meet the growing requirements of industry. In addition to these system innovations, the company also presented the newly developed material system Polypor type C in the year 2011. It allows voxeljet to meet customer demand for pure white plastic models. Moreover, this material also satisfies higher requirements regarding the stability and surface properties of the models. A year later in 2012, the first VX1000 printing system was sold to the British company Propshop (Model Makers) Ltd.. It was the fifth voxeljet system that was in use in the United Kingdom. The movie industry opened a completely new customer market for voxeljet. In the year 2012, voxeljet introduced its smallest system, the VX200, to the market. This printing system uses the same method as the larger series, but is very compact and easy to operate.

IPO
In the year 2013, the company went ahead with its IPO on the New York Stock Exchange. To this end, voxeljet technology GmbH was converted into a stock corporation that now operates as voxeljet AG. On 17 October 2013, voxeljet placed 6.5 million ADS on the NYSE at an issue price of US$13. Five American Depositary Receipt corresponded to one share. The IPO enabled voxeljet AG to take in US$64.5 million after deduction of the price discount granted to the issuing banks and issue costs. Six months after the IPO, voxeljet AG generated another US$41.1 million as part of a capital increase, after deduction of the price discount granted to the issuing banks and issue costs. In the process, the company issued another three million American Depositary Shares at the New York Stock Exchange at a unit price of US$15.

Globalization

To add to its global network of sales partners voxeljet AG began to set up its own international locations in the year 2014. On 1 October 2014, voxeljet AG took over the British company Propshop (Model Makers) Ltd., thus establishing its first location outside Germany. With the takeover, Propshop became a wholly owned subsidiary of voxeljet AG.  The company, which specializes in the film and entertainment industry, had already gained experience with voxeljet printing systems when it purchased the VX1000 in the year 2012. In the same year, voxeljet AG founded a new company in the USA. In January 2015, voxeljet began to operate a service center for the on-demand production of molds and models in Canton (Michigan), with the goal of reaching a printing capacity similar to the capacity at the home location in Friedberg by the end of 2016. In December 2015 voxeljet announced a joint venture with Suzhou Meimai Fast Manufacturing Technology in China. The joint venture shall be called voxeljet China Ltd. and will be headquartered in the city of Suzhou, near Shanghai. At the same time voxeljet AG established voxeljet India Pvt. Ltd. The new subsidiary is located in Pune, a large automotive and manufacturing center near Mumbai.

Technology and process

Process

The technology was first developed at the Massachusetts Institute of Technology in 1993 and is generally known as the "Powder bed and inkjet head 3D printing". As usual in the additive manufacturing processes, the part to be printed is built up from many thin cross sections of the 3D model. An inkjet print head moves across a bed of powder, simultaneously putting down a liquid binding material. After that, a thin layer of powder is extended across the completed section and the process is repeated several times with each layer adhering to the last.

Application area
The voxeljet process is particularly well-suited for the production of molds or models for metal casting applications in small series, such as prototypes, individual parts, props, investment casting or sand casting. In addition, the method is used for design samples, art and architecture components as well as in the aviation and aerospace industry, automotive industry, research and medicine and in the film and entertainment industry.

Materials
voxeljet offers two plastic materials based on PMMA particles bound by different resins. The Polypor B binder, available as a voxeljet service and for system customers in Europe, is ideal for parts that are true to detail and which require a high degree of edge sharpness, resolution and green compact strength. The Polypor C binder, on the other hand, lends itself to simplified burn-out processes in investment casting and for architectural models.

The sand types are selected individually for each order depending on the geometry and application purpose. voxeljet uses different sands with different granulations. The grain size that is used will decide the surface finish of the cast result. The most commonly used sand is made of quartz and is available in the granulations 0.14 mm, 0.19 mm and 0.25 mm. Also offered is the more temperature-resistant kerphalite sand, which is suited for especially complex geometries and internal cores for steel casting.

3D printing systems

See also
 List of 3D printer manufacturers

References

External links
The 3D Revolution

3D printing
Companies listed on the Nasdaq
Companies formerly listed on the New York Stock Exchange
3D printer companies
German companies established in 1999